Emil Jönsson Haag (born 15 August 1985) is a Swedish retired cross-country skier who competed between 2004 and 2018.

Career
At the 2010 Winter Olympics in Vancouver, he finished seventh in the individual sprint event.

He has twelve World Cup victories, all in sprint events, since 2008. He won the FIS Cross-Country Sprint World Cup in 2009–10 and 2010–11.

He won bronze in the sprint at the 2014 Winter Olympics in Sochi.

In March 2018, his retirement from cross-country skiing following the 2017–2018 season was announced.

Following his retirement he became sighted guide for visually impaired para athlete Zebastian Modin. They participated together at the 2022 Winter Paralympics and won a bronze medal in men's 20 km classical.

Cross-country skiing results
All results are sourced from the International Ski Federation (FIS).

Olympic Games
 2 medals – (2 bronze)

World Championships
 4 medals – (2 gold, 1 silver, 1 bronze)

World Cup

Season titles
 3 titles – (3 sprint)

Season standings

Individual podiums
 16 victories – (13 , 3 ) 
 25 podiums – (20 , 5 )

Team podiums
 1 victory – (1 ) 
 6 podiums – (1 , 5 )

Personal life
Jönsson married fellow skier and olympic medalist Anna Haag in 2018. They spend their time between Östersund and Davos.

References

External links
 Official website 
 
 
 

1985 births
Living people
People from Sandviken Municipality
Cross-country skiers from Gävleborg County
Cross-country skiers at the 2010 Winter Olympics
Cross-country skiers at the 2014 Winter Olympics
Olympic cross-country skiers of Sweden
Swedish male cross-country skiers
FIS Nordic World Ski Championships medalists in cross-country skiing
Medalists at the 2014 Winter Olympics
Olympic bronze medalists for Sweden
Olympic medalists in cross-country skiing
Paralympic sighted guides
Paralympic silver medalists for Sweden
Paralympic bronze medalists for Sweden
IFK Mora skiers
20th-century Swedish people
21st-century Swedish people